The Saudi Landbridge is a railway line currently under development by the Saudi Railway Company (SAR).

Intended mainly for freight, the railway will connect Jeddah on the Red Sea coast with the Saudi Arabian capital Riyadh. The existing 450 km line between Riyadh and Dammam will be upgraded, and a second 115 km new line is planned to connect Dammam with Jubail on the coast of the Persian Gulf. The newly constructed lines will be single track, but the infrastructure (including bridges and tunnels) will be designed to permit a future upgrade to dual track. The project is part of the Saudi vision 2030 that aims at being a logistic hub that connects the three contracts together.

History
On 21 April 2008 the Tarabot consortium of seven Saudi companies and Asciano of Australia, was named as preferred bidder for the 50-year build, own the concession for the Landbridge project, with financial close planned within 12 months.

Completion was planned for 2010, however financial close could not be agreed.
 
On 10 October 2011 the government decided the project would go ahead, but as a state project. The cost was put at up to USD 7 billion.

In July 2013, the contract for the design of the 958-kilometre Jeddah-Riyadh section of the project was awarded. The Saudi Public Investment Fund (PIF) awarded the contract to prepare the detailed design of the project to Italferr in August 2015. At the Middle East Rail 2017 conference and exhibition in Dubai on 7 March 2017, SRO President Rumaih Al Rumaih announced that the detailed design for the project had been completed. The project will be developed on a build, operate and transfer (BOT) basis.

See also 

Haramain high-speed railway
Gulf Railway

External links
 Saudi Railways Organization
 The Landbridge-dedicated page on the Saudi Railways site
 An estimated route map

References 

Proposed rail infrastructure in Saudi Arabia